Group Theatre may refer to:

 Group Theatre (London)
 Group Theatre (New York City)
 Group theatre of Kolkata
 Ulster Group Theatre, a former theatre, part of Ulster Hall, Belfast